The Brienz Rothorn Railway (BRB) is a tourist rack railway in Switzerland, which climbs from Brienz, at the eastern end of Lake Brienz, to the summit of the Brienzer Rothorn. The railway is 7.6 kilometres (4.7 mi) long, is built to 800 mm gauge ( gauge), and uses the Abt double lamella rack system. Unusually for Switzerland, the line is not electrified, and most trains are operated by steam locomotives.

The Brienz Rothorn Railway reaches a height of 2,244 metres above sea level and is the fourth-highest railway in Switzerland.

History 

The railway was opened on 17 June 1892, after a two years construction period. The two designers, engineer Alexander Lindner and contractor Theo Bertschinger were supported by the mountain railway pioneer Roman Abt, who had responsibility for equipping the line with his newly developed Abt double lamella rack system.

The line connected at Brienz with the Brünig railway line, which had been opened in 1888 from Brienz eastwards towards Lucerne. However, the Brünig railway was not extended westward to Interlaken until 1916, so many early travelers to the Rothorn had to arrive by boat service on Lake Brienz.

The line was quickly in financial difficulties. The line was designed to carry 25,000 passengers per year, but only managed 5,000 passengers in the first year. Tourist traffic was further affected by the opening of Schynige Platte Railway in 1895 and the Jungfraubahn in 1898. Train service was suspended on 1 August 1914 as a result of the First World War, but did not resume when the war ended.

Essential maintenance was carried out and a small amount of timber traffic was carried from Planalp in 1918. Carriages were hired to the Schynige Platte Railway in 1924 and 1925, providing funds for the maintenance work. The line was finally re-opened on 13 June 1931, the first train to reach the summit in 17 years having run four days earlier. The railway was in good condition because of the continued maintenance.

Unlike other Swiss mountain lines, the BRB was not electrified and this made the railway a special attraction as from 1953 to 1990 it was the only steam-operated line in Switzerland. Although other Swiss mountain railways offer special "steam" trips, this is the only line to offer a full steam service, the Diesel locomotive only being used for additional trains and for light traffic periods.

Route 
Also nearby is the quay used by the BLS AG shipping services on Lake Brienz.

The railway is single track with three passing loops. The older steam locomotives stop to take water.

A popular hiking trail runs between the summit station, and the Brünig-Hasliberg station at the point where the Brünig line crosses the Brünig Pass.

Locomotives and rolling stock 
All steam locomotives are Class H2/3, indicating that two of the three axles are driven, giving a wheel arrangement (Whyte System) of 0-4-2. The older locomotives are a side tank, "kneeling cow" design of a standard SLM product. The modern steam locomotives use an efficient "light oil" fired steam technology and were built by SLM (former Swiss Locomotive and Machine Works) of Winterthur.

A prototype Diesel locomotive, class Hm2/2, number 8, was delivered in 1973, but sold to the Chemin de fer Montreux-Glion-Rochers-de-Naye in 1995 as their Number 4. New Diesel locomotives were constructed by Ferdinand Steck Maschinenfabrik and are of (Whyte System) 0-4-0 wheel arrangement to a "kneeling cow" design.

Timetable 

The Brienz Rothorn Railway operated 7 days per week from June 4 to October 23, 2016, all the way up to the Rothorn. They tried to ensure that all their services are steam-powered.

See also 
 List of heritage railways and funiculars in Switzerland
 List of mountain railways in Switzerland

References

External links 
 

800 mm gauge railways in Switzerland
Mountain railways
Railway lines in Switzerland
Railway companies of Switzerland
Bernese Oberland
Rack railways in Switzerland
Brienz
Tourist attractions in the Canton of Bern
Railway lines opened in 1892
Railway lines closed in 1914
Railway lines opened in 1931
Railway companies established in 1890
Swiss companies established in 1890
Heritage railways in Switzerland